The 2007 IIFA Awards, officially known as the 8th International Indian Film Academy Awards ceremony, presented by the International Indian Film Academy honored the best films of 2006 and took place between 7–9 June 2007. The official ceremony took place on 9 June 2007, at the Hallam FM Arena in Sheffield, England. During the ceremony, IIFA Awards were awarded in 29 competitive categories. The ceremony was televised in India and internationally on Star Plus. Actors Boman Irani and Lara Dutta co–hosted the ceremony – the first time.

Some other salient events held during this weekend included the IIFA World Premiere, IIFA–BAFTA Film Workshop, FICCI–IIFA Global Business –um and the IIFA Foundation Celebrity Charity Cricket Match.

The tag line of the IIFA 2007 was IIFA 2007: Yorkshire "Love At First Sight".

IIFA returned to England, UK after Debutant London 2000.

Rang De Basanti led the ceremony with 21 nominations, followed by Omkara with 13 nominations and Dhoom 2 with 12 nominations.

Rang De Basanti won 11 awards, including Best Film and Best Supporting Actress (Soha Ali Khan), thus becoming the most–awarded film at the ceremony.

Lage Raho Munna Bhai and Omkara won 4 awards each. Other multiple winners included Krrish with 3 awards and Dhoom 2 and Fanaa with two each. In addition, films receiving a single award included, Kabhi Alvida Naa Kehna (Best Actress), Golmaal: Fun Unlimited (Best Comedian), 36 China Town (Best Male Debut) and Gangster (Best Female Debut).

Rajkumar Hirani and A. R. Rahman each won three awards at the ceremony.

Background
The awards began in 2000 and the first ceremony was held in London at The Millennium Dome. From then on the awards were held at locations around the world signifying the international success of Bollywood. The next award ceremony was announced to be held in Bangkok, Thailand in 2008.

Winners and nominees
Winners are listed first and highlighted in boldface.

Popular awards

Musical awards

Backstage awards

Technical awards

Special awards

Most Glamorous Star
 Aishwarya Rai & Hrithik Roshan – Dhoom 2

Creative Person of the Year Award
 Rakesh Roshan – Krrish

Special Award – Best Adaptation
 Vishal Bhardwaj – Omkara, adapted from Shakespeare's Othello

Outstanding Achievement by an Indian in International Cinema
 Deepa Mehta

Lifetime Achievement Award
 Basu Chatterjee
 Dharmendra

Multiple nominations and awards

The following eleven films received multiple nominations:
 Twenty One: Rang De Basanti
 Thirteen: Omkara
 Twelve: Dhoom 2
 Ten: Lage Raho Munna Bhai
 Nine: Kabhi Alvida Naa Kehna and Krrish
 Seven: Gangster
 Three: Fanaa

The following films received multiple awards:
 Eleven: Rang De Basanti
 Four: Lage Raho Munna Bhai and Omkara
 Three: Dhoom 2 and Krrish
 Two: Fanaa

References

2007 Indian film awards
IIFA awards